Belarusians in Ukraine are the third biggest minority after Russians. Unlike many other ethnic groups, Belarusians do not have any particular concentration in the country, but spread out more-less evenly across all regions.

History 

During the Russo-Ukrainian War Belarusian volunteers fought alongside Ukraine. The first foreign volunteer group in Ukraine was the Pahonia detachment, founded in 2014 during the War in Donbas. The following year, the tactical group "Belarus" was formed uniting Belarusian volunteers fighting in different battalions The Monument to the Belarusians who died for Ukraine in Kyiv is dedicated to the Belarusian volunteers who died during the Russian-Ukrainian War. On March 9, 2022, the creation of the Kastuś Kalinoŭski Battalion was announced which was later transformed into a regiment. On March 30, 2022, the beginning of the formation of another Belarusian unit, the Pahonia Regiment was announced which is part of the International Legion of Territorial Defence of Ukraine.

Location and number 
In Ukraine, the number of Belarusians is estimated at over 275,000 (the 2001 Ukrainian Census). Most of the Belarusians diaspora in Ukraine appeared as a result of the migration of Belarusians to the Ukrainian SSR during the Soviet Union. Lviv has been an important center of Belarusian social and cultural life during the Russian Empire and interwar Poland. There are now Belarusian organizations in major cities like Lviv, Sevastopol in the Crimea, and others. A notable Ukrainian of Belarusian descent is Viktor Yanukovych, the fourth president of Ukraine.

See also  
 Belarus–Ukraine relations
 Belarusian language in Ukraine

References

External link

Ukraine
Ethnic groups in Ukraine
Ukrainian people of Belarusian descent